Mallory "Mal" Book is a fictional character appearing in American comic books published by Marvel Comics. She is depicted as a lawyer who is a rival of She-Hulk, and later the secret supervillain chairwoman of Fourth Wall Enterprises. The character first appeared in She-Hulk #1 (May 2004) and was created by Dan Slott.

The character made her live-action debut in the Marvel Cinematic Universe (MCU) Disney+ series She-Hulk: Attorney at Law (2022), portrayed by actress Renée Elise Goldsberry.

Fictional character biography
Mallory Book is a lawyer employed by Goodman, Lieber, Kurtzberg & Holliway. She has a reputation for not only being beautiful, but also for being a tough defendant in court. She had garnered the nickname "The Face Who's Never Lost a Case", which doesn't intimidate Jennifer Walters. In her first appearance, Mallory clearly shows disdain towards Jennifer having to step out as She-Hulk so she can save the world. In her next appearance, she represents a man who Doctor Strange had "wrongfully" captured. When the man is let go, Strange admits that he will be gunned down days later, shocking Mallory. Mallory and Jen soon begin working together with the former acting mostly oppressive over the latter. Mallory admits that Jen is "useful" in that she is good with heavy lifting. Even when Jen rescues her from a propeller blade, she fails to show any real gratitude.

Mallory further mocks Jen when their boss Holden Holliway implies that she serve as a "baby-sitter" of sorts for his granddaughter Sasha.

However, Mallory has been spited by Jen. One example being when while representing Hercules, who had caused considerable physical damage to Constrictor, Jen had suggested that Hercules just simply pay for the damages which he took over Mallory's suggestion of pleading insanity by stating that he was not the son of Zeus.

Mallory is critically injured during Titania's rampage, but survives.

When the firm is rebuilt, Mallory is in a wheelchair and is shown defending Ox and Boomerang. She still holds a grudge against Jen who in turn is baffled by her defending villains now.

Mallory is ultimately revealed to be the supervillain chairwoman of Fourth Wall Enterprises, seeking to bring an end to all metafictional beings. Having gained Jen's respect, Mallory elects to temporarily shut down the She-Hulk Project due to the cancellation of the ongoing She-Hulk title, with her board speculating she will resume her plans once a new ongoing She-Hulk series featuring her is commissioned, lest "Book's cancelled" become a reality.

In other media
Renée Elise Goldsberry appears as Mallory Book in the Marvel Cinematic Universe television series She-Hulk: Attorney at Law (2022). She is a lawyer who works in the same law office as Walters.

References

External links
  at Marvel Wiki

Fictional American lawyers
Marvel Comics characters